The fifth season of Bake Off Brasil premiered on August 10, 2019 at 10:30 p.m. on SBT.

Bakers
The following is a list of contestants:

Results summary

Key
  Advanced
  Judges' favourite bakers
  Star Baker
  Withdrew
  Eliminated
  Judges' bottom bakers
  Returned
  Runner-up
  Winner

Technical challenges ranking

Key
  Star Baker
  Eliminated

Ratings and reception

Brazilian ratings
All numbers are in points and provided by Kantar Ibope Media.

References

External links 

 Bake Off Brasil on SBT

2019 Brazilian television seasons